Stanley Gregory Beckensall  is an international rock art expert.
He was the first male graduate of Keele University.
He was a Station Education Officer in the Royal Air Force, on National Service.
He became head of English at Ifield Grammar School, Crawley New Town, Sussex.
He was head of English in a large comprehensive school in Malta for two years.
Afterwards, he moved to Northumberland to train teachers at Alnwick College of Education.
He was later head teacher of two Northumberland schools, and was chairman of the Northumberland Teachers of Drama Association.
He had written and produced many plays for young people and adults, two of which were broadcast on BBC Radio Newcastle, though he remains most famous for his writings on Prehistoric Rock Art.
He has appeared on British television and in other British media many times.
But his passion in life has remained prehistoric rock art.

In May 2004, Stan Beckensall was awarded an Honorary Doctorate from the University of Newcastle upon Tyne for his contribution to the study of British rock art.
In 2005 on the UNESCO colloquium on world rock art, he represented Great Britain. In 2006, his website was awarded the Channel Four television ICT British Archaeological Award.

He was appointed a Member of the Order of the British Empire (MBE) in the 2019 New Year Honours for services to Prehistoric Rock Art and History in Britain.

List of published works 

 The Prehistoric Carved Rocks of Northumberland (1974)
 Northumberland place-names (1975)
 Life and Death in Prehistoric Northumberland (1976)
 Northumberland's Prehistoric Rock Carvings (1983)
 Rock Carvings of Northern Britain (August 1986)
 Hexham, History Beneath Our Feet (1991)
 Prehistoric Motifs of Northumberland Vol. 1 (1991)
 Prehistoric Motifs of Northumberland Vol. 2 (1992)
 Cumbrian Prehistoric Rock Art (1992)
 The Spindelstone Dragon (*) (1993)
 Life and Death in the Prehistoric North (1994)
 Shepherds, Rogues and Angels (*) (1995)
 Prehistoric Rock Art of County Durham, Swaledale and Wensleydale (1998)
 Prehistoric Rock Art in Northumberland (Oct 2001)
 British Prehistoric Rock Art (Aug 2002)
 Prehistoric Rock Art in Cumbria (Jun 2002)
 Prehistoric Northumberland (Mar 2003)
 Northumberland, Shadows of the Past (Jul 2005)
 The Prehistoric Rock Art of Kilmartin (2005)
 Place Names and Field names of Northumberland (Feb 2006)
 Circles in Stone: a British Prehistoric Mystery (Oct 2006)
 Hexham, A History and Guide (2007)
 Northumberland from the air (2008)

Unquiet grave. A novel (2008) Powdene, Newcastle*

Northumberland's Hidden History (2009), Amberley
Prehistoric Rock Art in Britain (2009), Amberley
Northumberland Viewpoints (2010), Amberley
Empire Halts Here: Viewing the heart of Hadrian's Wall (2010), Amberley
Coastal castles of Northumberland (2011), Amberley
Hills and Valleys of Northumberland (2012), Amberley
Hexham Through Time (2012), Amberley
Northumberland Churches (2013), Amberley
Northumberland Prehistoric Rock Art 3rd printing (2014), The History Press
Forthcoming in 2014: Northumberland: a Celebration, Fonthill Media, Stroud
Pilgrimage: a tour of Northumberland in pictures and poems, Fonthill

(*) Non fiction writings; plays.

References

Further reading

External links 

 Northumberland Rock Art, a photo archive of Beckensall's studies.

Prehistoric art
Alumni of Keele University
Living people
Members of the Order of the British Empire
Year of birth missing (living people)